Lefamulin, sold under the brand name Xenleta, is an antibiotic medication used it to treat adults with community-acquired bacterial pneumonia. It is taken by mouth or by injection into a vein.

Relatively common side effects include diarrhea, nausea, pain at the site of injection, and liver inflammation. It is a pleuromutilin antibiotic that inhibits the large subunit of bacterial ribosomes.

Lefamulin was approved for medical use in the United States in August 2019, and in the European Union in July 2020.

Medical uses
Lefamulin is used to treat adults with community-acquired bacterial pneumonia. It was also investigated for treatment of acute bacterial skin and skin-structure infections (ABSSSI).

Spectrum of activity
Lefamulin has in vitro activity against Streptococcus pneumoniae, viridans group Streptococci, Moraxella catarrhalis, Enterococcus faecium, methicillin-resistant Staphylococcus aureus (MRSA), among other bacteria.

History
It was developed by Nabriva Therapeutics and approved in the United States in 2019. It was granted fast track status by the US Food and Drug Administration (FDA) in 2014. Although pleuromutilin antibiotics were first developed in the 1950s, lefamulin is the first to be used for systemic treatment of bacterial infections in humans.

Society and culture

Legal status 
Lefamulin was approved for medical use in the United States in August 2019, and in the European Union in July 2020.

References

External links
 

Pleuromutilin antibiotics
Vinyl compounds